The Treaty of Königsberg was signed in Königsberg (Królewiec) on May 26, 1390 during the Lithuanian Civil War (1389–1392) between Samogitian nobles and representatives of the Teutonic Knights. The 31-member or 30-member delegation from seven Samogitian regions (Ariogala, Kaltinėnai, Knituva, Kražiai, Medingėnai, Raseiniai, and Viduklė) arrived to Königsberg around the pentecost. They promised their loyalty to "their king" Vytautas and guaranteed trade freedom for the Knights in Samogitia. The Knights gifted the nobles with food and clothes.

Vytautas the Great waged a civil against his cousin Jogaila, Grand Duke of Lithuania and King of Poland. In order to secure Teutonic support in the civil war, Vytautas signed the Treaty of Lyck and granted Samogitia up to the Nevėžis River to the Knights on January 19, 1390. Samogitia was important for the Knights as this territory physically separated them from uniting with the Livonian Order in the north. Support of Samogitians was crucial to Vytautas as it was the only guarantee that the Treaty of Lyck would be carried out. However, Vytautas betrayed the Knights when in 1392 he reconciled with his cousin Jogaila and signed the Ostrów Agreement. Samogitia was not ceded to the Knights until the Treaty of Salynas in 1398. The treaty and the 30 names of Samogitian nobles are important for the study of personal names in pagan Lithuania.

List of Samogitian nobles

Notes

References

Treaties of the Teutonic Order
Königsberg
1390s treaties
Treaties of the Grand Duchy of Lithuania
1390 in Europe
14th century in the State of the Teutonic Order
History of Samogitia
14th century in Lithuania